Andrew Pierce (born 14 January 1974) is an Australian former professional rugby league footballer who played for the Cronulla Sharks and the Adelaide Rams.

Biography
Pierce, a forward recruited locally from De La Salle College, Cronulla, made his first-grade debut for Cronulla in the 1993 NSWRL season. 

After four seasons at Cronulla, he joined the inaugural Adelaide Rams squad, to compete in the 1997 Super League, remaining with the club when they switched to the National Rugby League the following year.

In 1999 returned to Cronulla after the Rams folded. Cronulla claimed the minor premiership that season and Pierce featured in all 26 games, including the preliminary final loss to St. George Illawarra.

Following the 2002 season, Pierce had left Cronulla to play for Leigh in England.

His father, Barry Pierce, was a long serving chairman of the Cronulla Sharks. He also has a brother Greg, not to be confused with the former player, who was the club's CEO from 2006 to 2007.

References

External links
Andrew Pierce at Rugby League project

1974 births
Living people
Australian rugby league players
Cronulla-Sutherland Sharks players
Adelaide Rams players
Rugby league players from Sydney
Rugby league props
Rugby league second-rows
Rugby league locks
People educated at De La Salle College, Cronulla